Prionapteryx triplecta is a moth in the family Crambidae. It was described by Edward Meyrick in 1935. It is found in the Democratic Republic of the Congo.

References

Ancylolomiini
Moths described in 1935